Diplodonta verrilli, or Verrill's diplodon, is a species of bivalve mollusc in the family Ungulinidae. It can be found along the Atlantic coast of North America, ranging from Massachusetts to North Carolina.

References

Ungulinidae
Molluscs described in 1900